Chris Burke or Christopher Burke may refer to:
 Christopher Burke (Irish revolutionary) (1898–1964), Irish revolutionary, hunger striker and sportsman
Chris Burke (actor) (born 1965), American actor and folk singer
 Chris Burke (baseball) (born 1980), Major League Baseball player
 Chris Burke (footballer) (born 1983), Scottish footballer
 Christopher Burke (design writer) (born 1967), British typeface designer and author on typography
Christopher J. Burke, U.S. Magistrate Judge of the U.S. District Court for the District of Delaware
 Christopher Burke, guitarist with Beach Fossils
 Christopher Burke, astronomer Ursa Minor Dwarf
 Chris Burke (priest) (born 1965), British Vice-Dean and Canon Precentor of Sheffield Cathedral, and Archdeacon-designate of Barking

See also
 Chris Burke-Gaffney, Canadian songwriter and producer